The Tunguska is a river in the Khabarovsk Krai in Russia. It is a left tributary of the Amur. It is formed at the confluence of the rivers Kur and Urmi. It flows into the Amur about 15 km north of the city Khabarovsk.

See also
List of rivers of Russia

References

External links

Rivers of Khabarovsk Krai